Spry is a census-designated place (CDP) in York County, Pennsylvania, United States. The population was 4,891 at the 2010 census.

Geography
Spry is located at  (39.912566, -76.687216) in York Township, south of the city of York.

Demographics
At the 2000 census there were 4,903 people, 2,125 households, and 1,411 families living in the CDP. The population density was 1,902.7 people per square mile (733.7/km). There were 2,204 housing units at an average density of 855.3/sq mi (329.8/km).  The racial makeup of the CDP was 96.15% White, 1.51% African American, 0.12% Native American, 1.20% Asian, 0.14% from other races, and 0.88% from two or more races. Hispanic or Latino of any race were 1.31%.

Of the 2,125 households 26.7% had children under the age of 18 living with them, 55.1% were married couples living together, 9.0% had a female householder with no husband present, and 33.6% were non-families. 28.4% of households were one person and 10.1% were one person aged 65 or older. The average household size was 2.27 and the average family size was 2.77.

The age distribution was 21.6% under the age of 18, 5.8% from 18 to 24, 29.7% from 25 to 44, 26.0% from 45 to 64, and 16.8% 65 or older. The median age was 41 years. For every 100 females, there were 93.0 males. For every 100 females age 18 and over, there were 89.2 males.

The median household income was $49,240 and the median family income  was $57,344. Males had a median income of $41,436 versus $31,587 for females. The per capita income for the CDP was $24,564. About 3.5% of families and 5.2% of the population were below the poverty line, including 6.0% of those under age 18 and 6.3% of those age 65 or over.

References

Census-designated places in York County, Pennsylvania
Census-designated places in Pennsylvania